Hecticoceratinae is a subfamily of oppeliids from the Middle and Upper Jurassic typically with strong falcoid or falcate ribbing that covers whorl sides completely. Venters are usually keeled and may be tricarinate.

The Hecticocerainae, which has its origin in the Oppeliinae, give rise to the Distichoceratinae near the beginning of the Middle Jurassic Callovian, and to the Glochiceratinae early in the Upper Jurassic Oxfordian. Neither apparently gave rise to any subsequent groups.

Genera
Hecticoceras,  Brightia, Eochetoceras, Hecticoceratoides, Lunuloceras, Kheraites, Proheticoceras, Pseudobrightia, and Pseudobrightia, listed as separate genera in the Treatise are regarded as subgenera of Hecticoceras

References

Oppeliidae
Jurassic ammonites
Bathonian first appearances
Late Jurassic extinctions